Norman Anderson may refer to:

Norman C. Anderson (born 1928), Speaker of the Wisconsin State Assembly
Norman B. Anderson (born 1955), CEO of the American Psychological Association
Norman H. Anderson (1923–2022), social psychologist at the University of California, San Diego
Norman Dalrymple Anderson (1908–1994), English missionary
Norman Anderson (athlete) (1902–1978), American track and field athlete
Norman Anderson, birth name of Normski, British musician
G. Norman Anderson (born 1932), American ambassador to Sudan
Norman Anderson (footballer) (born 1997), Belizean footballer